Markwell is a surname. Notable people with the surname include:

Diego Markwell (born 1980), Dutch baseball player
Don Markwell, talk radio personality in Montgomery, Alabama
Donald Markwell (born 1959), Australian social scientist and college president
Terry Markwell an American born actress, born in Phoenix, Arizona

de:Markwell